Alexander Badawy (November 29, 1913 – May 1986) was an Egyptian Egyptologist. He was born in Egypt and taught Egyptology in the United States. He was professor of art history at UCLA, and after he became emeritus, he endowed a chair (in 1985) at Johns Hopkins University, currently held by Betsy Bryan.

Selected publications
 Coptic Art and Archaeology: The Art of the Christian Egyptians from the Late Antique to the Middle Ages, 1978
 Architecture in Ancient Egypt and the Near East, 1966
 A history of Egyptian architecture

References

1913 births
1986 deaths
Egyptian archaeologists
Egyptian Egyptologists
Egyptian people of Coptic descent
Egyptian expatriates in the United States
University of California, Los Angeles faculty
20th-century archaeologists